Deconstructeam is a Spanish video game developer based in Valencia. Founded in March 2012 by Jordi de Paco, it is best known for developing Gods Will Be Watching (2014) and The Red Strings Club (2018), both published by Devolver Digital, which became their publisher after the 26th Ludum Dare game jam. The company made a notable leap after that moment, reaching more than 20,000 € in crowdfunding platform Indiegogo and becoming one of the most relevant independent video game company located in Spain during the mid and late 2010s.

Games developed 
 Gods Will Be Watching
 The Red Strings Club
 Atticus VII
 Underground Hangovers
 Dungen Dogan's Cursed Crew
 Ages of Irving
 Newbie Conviction
 Fear Syndicate Thesis
 Deconstructorium
 Q.S.U.D.I.
 A Heart for Dimitri
 Dan and the Stone Mask
 Interview with the Whisperer

References

External links 
 

Companies based in Valencia
Indie video game developers
Spanish companies established in 2012
Video game companies established in 2012
Video game companies of Spain
Video game development companies